Presque Isle is an unincorporated community located in the town of Presque Isle, Vilas County, Wisconsin, United States. Presque Isle has a post office with ZIP code 54557.

History
In 1905, J.J. Foster erected a lumber mill on the side of a pond at the headwaters of the Presque Isle River. The townsite commands a large hill virtually on the Continental Divide and the waters flow north from this point to Lake Superior. Foster named the community Fosterville.  William S. Winegar bought the mill in 1910 and the town was renamed in his honor.  The mill closed in 1933 and Walleye Rearing Ponds were established on the mill grounds by the State of Wisconsin.  In 1959, the town changed its name again, now to Presque Isle which matches the name of the surrounding township which comprises approximately 77 square miles.  The village is currently the site of the Presque Isle Community Center, Presque Isle Fire Department, and the Presque Isle Community Library.

Transportation

References

Unincorporated communities in Vilas County, Wisconsin
Unincorporated communities in Wisconsin